Adriano Bispo dos Santos (born 29 May 1987), or simply Adriano, is a Brazilian professional footballer who plays as a defensive midfielder for Amazonas FC.

Career
After progressing on Santos' youth categories, Adriano made his professional debut against Paraná in a 1–0 home victory on November 11, 2006. After 18 minutes on the field, he was sent off with two yellow cards.

On 20 January 2008, Adriano made a performance in a Campeonato Paulista home draw against Palmeiras, marking Jorge Valdivia tightly, and "switching off" the opposition player.

In 2009, Adriano was loaned to São Caetano.

He then returned to Santos in the end of 2010, and in 2011 Copa Libertadores, he became an important first team player, after marking Alejandro Martinuccio (Peñarol's most important player).

Adriano was expected to be a first team player in 2011 FIFA Club World Cup, but he picked up an ankle injury (which needs a surgery) and cannot be registered.

In June 2014, Adriano was loaned by Grêmio to Vitória until the end of the season.

Career statistics
(Correct )

1 Including Copa Sudamericana and Recopa Sudamericana.

Honours

Club
Santos
Campeonato Paulista: 2007, 2011, 2012
Copa Libertadores de América: 2011
Recopa Sudamericana: 2012

References

External links

1987 births
Living people
People from São Vicente, São Paulo
Brazilian footballers
Association football midfielders
Campeonato Brasileiro Série A players
Campeonato Brasileiro Série B players
Campeonato Brasileiro Série C players
Santos FC players
Associação Desportiva São Caetano players
Grêmio Foot-Ball Porto Alegrense players
Esporte Clube Vitória players
Avaí FC players
Grêmio Novorizontino players
Goiás Esporte Clube players
Clube de Regatas Brasil players
Esporte Clube Santo André players
Associação Portuguesa de Desportos players
Sociedade Imperatriz de Desportos players
Footballers from São Paulo (state)
Amazonas Futebol Clube players